During the 2011–12 English football season, Charlton Athletic competed in the Football League One.  Charlton Athletic sealed a promotion to the 2012–13 Football League Championship on 14 April 2012, and clinched the Football League One championship on 21 April 2012.

League table

Squad statistics

Appearances and goals

|-
|colspan="14"|Players registered to Charlton this season who are no longer at the club:

|-
|colspan="14"|Players who played for Charlton on loan and returned to their parent club:

|-
|colspan="14"|Players who were registered to Charlton without making a senior appearance:

|}

Top scorers

Disciplinary record

Results

Club Standings

Round-by-Round Results

Pre-season friendlies

League One

FA Cup

League Cup
Charlton's first round tie against Reading drawn for 9 August 2011 was postponed on police advice due to the riots happening in London.

Football League Trophy 
Charlton were awarded a bye for Round 1 of this season's Football League Trophy.

Transfers

Notes

References

Charlton Athletic F.C. seasons
Charlton Athletic F.C.